The 1934 Northwestern Wildcats team represented Northwestern University during the 1934 college football season. In their eighth year under head coach Dick Hanley, the Wildcats compiled a 3–5 record (2–3 against Big Ten Conference opponents) and finished in fifth place in the Big Ten Conference.

Schedule

References

Northwestern
Northwestern Wildcats football seasons
Northwestern Wildcats football